Marketplace is an Irish finance and business current affairs television programme that was broadcast on RTÉ Television. It was first broadcast on 3 October 1987 and was presented at various times by Patrick Kinsella, Gavin Duffy, Gary Agnew, Miriam O'Callaghan, Ingrid Miley and George Lee. Marketplace was broadcast for the last time on 3 April 1996. The programme noted for its in-depth analysis of political, business and financial matters.

There is clips of it on Frank Dunlop about Quarryvale in 1993 and Denis O'Brien in 1995 programmes of Reeling in the Years.

During Christmas 2021 the complete of all 9 series will be available on RTE Player to celebrate 60 years of television.

See also
 List of programmes broadcast by RTÉ

References

1987 Irish television series debuts
1996 Irish television series endings
1980s Irish television series
1990s Irish television series
Irish television news shows
RTÉ News and Current Affairs
RTÉ original programming